is a Japanese politician of the Democratic Party of Japan, a member of the House of Representatives in the Diet (national legislature). A native of Fukuoka, Fukuoka and graduate of Hitotsubashi University, he was elected to the House of Representatives for the first time in 2003 after an unsuccessful run in 2000.

References

External links 
 Official website 

Members of the House of Representatives (Japan)
Living people
1964 births
Hitotsubashi University alumni
People from Fukuoka
Democratic Party of Japan politicians
21st-century Japanese politicians